Danilo Arturo Galindo (born 4 March 1963) is a retired Honduran football player who played for the national team in the 1980s and 90s.

Club career
Nicknamed Pollo (Chicken), Galindo played for Honduran sides Platense, Vida, Olimpia and Palestino as well as in Peru for León de Huánuco and Ciclista Lima. He also played alongside compatriot Nicolás Suazo at Herediano in Costa Rica, he did not score a goal for the club. He played with  Nahúm Espinoza, Alex Pineda Chacón, Belarmino Rivera, Juan Carlos Espinoza and Eugenio Dolmo Flores in the Olimpia and they won the CONCACAF Champions League in 1988.

International career
Galindo made his debut for Honduras in a September 1985 FIFA World Cup qualification match against Canada and has earned a total of 9 caps, scoring no goals. He has represented his country in only that one FIFA World Cup qualification match and played at the 1991 UNCAF Nations Cup.

His final international was a May 1991 UNCAF Nations Cup match against Guatemala.

Retirement
Galindo moved to the United States in 2000 to find a job as a painter in Boca Raton.

Personal life
Pollo is son of Asunción and Mercedes Galindo and he is married to Ángela Jiménez de Galindo. He has 2 daughters Ingrid Daniella and Ana  Maria and 1 son Danilo Armando Galindo .

Honours and awards

Club
C.D. Olimpia
Liga Profesional de Honduras (4):1986–87  1987–88, 1989–90, 1995–96
CONCACAF Champions League (1): 1988

References

External links
 El Mitch cambió la vida del Pollo Galindo (Profile) - Diez 

1963 births
Living people
People from La Ceiba
Association football defenders
Honduran footballers
Honduras international footballers
Platense F.C. players
C.D.S. Vida players
C.D. Olimpia players
C.S. Herediano footballers
León de Huánuco footballers
Ciclista Lima Association footballers
Honduran expatriate footballers
Expatriate footballers in Costa Rica
Expatriate footballers in Peru
Liga Nacional de Fútbol Profesional de Honduras players